Saint-Michel is the name or part of the name of many places. Michel is French for Michael, and in most cases, these placenames refer to Michael (archangel).

Places

In Canada 
 Saint-Michel, Montreal, a neighbourhood in the Montreal borough of Villeray–Saint-Michel–Parc-Extension and a former city from 1912 to 1968
 Saint-Michel, Quebec, a parish municipality south-east of Montreal
 Saint-Michel-de-Bellechasse, a municipality in the Chaudière-Appalaches region of Quebec
 Saint-Michel-des-Saints, Quebec, a municipality in the Lanaudière region
 Saint-Michel-du-Squatec, Quebec, a parish municipality in the Bas-Saint-Laurent region
 Saint-Michel-d'Yamaska, a town and former municipality now part of Yamaska, Quebec
 Saint-Michel-de-Rougemont, a community in Rougemont, Quebec
 Saint-Michel or Saint-Michel-de-Wentworth, a community in the Laurentian Hills of Wentworth-Nord, Quebec
 Saint-Michel, a defunct federal electoral district
 Mont-Saint-Michel, Quebec, a municipality in the Laurentides region

In France 
 Saint-Michel, Aisne, in the Aisne département
 Saint-Michel, Ariège, in the Ariège département
 Saint-Michel, Charente, in the Charente département
 Saint-Michel, Haute-Garonne, in the Haute-Garonne département
 Saint-Michel, Gers, in the Gers département
 Saint-Michel, Hérault, in the Hérault département
 Saint-Michel, Loiret, in the Loiret département
 Saint-Michel, Pyrénées-Atlantiques, in the Pyrénées-Atlantiques département
 Saint-Michel, Tarn-et-Garonne, in the Tarn-et-Garonne département
 Mont-Saint-Michel, in the Manche département
 Saint-Michel-Chef-Chef, in the Loire-Atlantique département
 Saint-Michel-d'Aurance, in the Ardèche département
 Saint-Michel-de-Bannières, in the Lot département
 Saint-Michel-de-Boulogne, in the Ardèche département
 Saint-Michel-de-Castelnau, in the Gironde département
 Saint-Michel-de-Chabrillanoux, in the Ardèche département
 Saint-Michel-de-Chaillol, in the Hautes-Alpes département
 Saint-Michel-de-Chavaignes, in the Sarthe département
 Saint-Michel-de-Dèze, in the Lozère département
 Saint-Michel-de-Double, in the Dordogne département
 Saint-Michel-de-Feins, in the Mayenne département
 Saint-Michel-de-Fronsac, in the Gironde département
 Saint-Michel-de-Lanès, in the Aude département
 Saint-Michel-de-la-Pierre, in the Manche département
 Saint-Michel-de-Lapujade, in the Gironde département
 Saint-Michel-de-la-Roë, in the Mayenne département
 Saint-Michel-de-Livet, in the Calvados département
 Saint-Michel-de-Llotes, in the Pyrénées-Orientales département
 Saint-Michel-de-Maurienne, in the Savoie département
 Saint-Michel-de-Montaigne, in the Dordogne département
 Saint-Michel-de-Montjoie, in the Manche département
 Saint-Michel-de-Plélan, in the Côtes-d'Armor département
 Saint-Michel-de-Rieufret, in the Gironde département
 Saint-Michel-de-Saint-Geoirs, in the Isère département
 Saint-Michel-des-Andaines, in the Orne département
 Saint-Michel-d'Euzet, in the Gard département
 Saint-Michel-de-Vax, in the Tarn département
 Saint-Michel-de-Veisse, in the Creuse département
 Saint-Michel-de-Villadeix, in the Dordogne département
 Saint-Michel-de-Volangis, in the Cher département
 Saint-Michel-d'Halescourt, in the Seine-Maritime département
 Saint-Michel-en-Beaumont, in the Isère département
 Saint-Michel-en-Brenne, in the Indre département
 Saint-Michel-en-Grève, in the Côtes-d'Armor département
 Saint-Michel-en-l'Herm, in the Vendée département
 Saint-Michel-Escalus, in the Landes département
 Saint-Michel-et-Chanveaux, in the Maine-et-Loire département
 Saint-Michel-Labadié, in the Tarn département
 Saint-Michel-le-Cloucq, in the Vendée département
 Saint-Michel-les-Portes, in the Isère département
 Saint-Michel-l'Observatoire, in the Alpes-de-Haute-Provence département
 Saint-Michel-Loubéjou, in the Lot département
 Saint-Michel-Mont-Mercure, in the Vendée département
 Saint-Michel-sous-Bois, in the Pas-de-Calais département
 Saint-Michel-sur-Loire, in the Indre-et-Loire département
 Saint-Michel-sur-Meurthe, in the Vosges département
 Saint-Michel-sur-Orge, in the Essonne département
 Saint-Michel-sur-Rhône, in the Loire département
 Saint-Michel-sur-Savasse, in the Drôme département
 Saint-Michel-sur-Ternoise, in the Pas-de-Calais département
 Saint-Michel-Tubœuf, in the Orne département
 Saint Mihiel Abbey, in the Meuse département

Other places 
 Saint-Michel, Burkina Faso, a village in Banwa Province
 Saint Michel, Monaco, a modern ward of the district of Monte-Carlo, in the Principality of Monaco
 Saint-Michel-de-Cuxa, a Benedictine abbey in the French Pyrénées-Orientales département
 Saint-Michel-de-l'Atalaye, a community in the Artibonite Department of Haiti
 Sankt Michel (abbrv. S:t Michel), the Swedish name for the Finnish town Mikkeli

Transit
 Saint-Michel (Paris Métro)
Saint-Michel station (Montreal Metro), a Montreal Metro station in Montreal, Quebec, Canada
Saint-Michel–Montréal-Nord station, a commuter rail station in Montreal, Quebec, Canada
 Station Saint-Michel (Tram de Bordeaux), a tram station in Bordeaux, France

Other uses 
 AS Saint Michel, a football club based in Antananarivo, Madagascar
 Biscuiterie Saint-Michel, a French food company based in Contres
 Collège Saint-Michel, a Gymnasium school in Fribourg, Switzerland

See also 
 Michel (disambiguation)
 Saint Michael (disambiguation)
 Mont Saint Michel (disambiguation)